Sing for Me may also refer to:

 "Sing for Me" (Christina Aguilera song), a 2012 song by Christina Aguilera
 "Sing for Me" (Andreas Johnson song), a 2006 single by Andreas Johnson

See also
 Sing to Me (disambiguation)